Amanullin is a cyclic peptide. It is an amatoxin, all of which are found in several members of the mushroom genus Amanita. The oral  of amanullin is approximately 20 mg/kg in mice; however, it is non-toxic in humans.

Toxicology

Like other amatoxins, amanullin is an inhibitor of RNA polymerase II.  Amanullin has a species dependent and specific attraction to the enzyme RNA polymerase II. Upon ingestion, it binds to the RNA polymerase II enzyme, effectively causing cytolysis of hepatocytes (liver cells).

See also
Mushroom poisoning

References

External links
Amatoxins REVISED 
Poisonous Mushrooms (German)

Peptides
Amatoxins
Hepatotoxins